The 2014 MLS Cup Playoffs (branded as the 2014 MLS Cup Playoffs presented by AT&T for sponsorship reasons) was the nineteenth post-season tournament culminating the Major League Soccer regular season. The tournament began in late October and culminated on December 7, 2014 with MLS Cup 2014, the nineteenth league championship for MLS.

The 2014 playoffs was the first time that the away goals rule was applied to the home-and-away, aggregate-goal series. The first series impacted by the rule was a Western Conference semifinal that saw the Seattle Sounders advance past FC Dallas when the first match (held in Dallas) ended 1–1 and the second (held in Seattle) ended 0–0.

LA Galaxy defeated New England Revolution 2–1 after extra time in the MLS Cup 2014, thus earning a spot in the 2015–16 CONCACAF Champions League.

Sporting Kansas City were the defending champions, but they were eliminated in the Eastern Conference Knockout Round by New York Red Bulls.

Format 

The top five teams from both the Western Conference and the Eastern Conference qualified and are seeded in the MLS Playoffs in order to determine conference champions. The two conference champions will face off in the MLS Cup.

Knockout round 
The fourth and fifth seeds in each conference play a single match hosted by the fourth seed. The winners advance to the conference semifinals.

Conference Semifinals and Conference Finals 
In the conference semifinals, the first seed in each conference plays the winner of their conference knockout round match. Also in that same round, the second and third seeded teams in each conference play one another. The teams winning the conference semifinal matches advance to their respective conference final.

In these two rounds, all matches are played in home-and-away aggregate-goal format. The lower seeded team hosts the first leg of the series and the higher seeded team hosts the second leg. The first leg lasts the usual 90-minutes and can end in a tie. In the second leg, if the two teams are tied after 90-minutes (180-minute total) then the team that scored more goals away from home advances to the next round.

If there is still a tie after the away goals rule is applied, a 30-minute overtime period (divided into two 15-minute periods) is played followed by a penalty kick shootout, if necessary.  The away goals rule does not apply to goals scored in the overtime period.

MLS Cup 
The two conference champions face each other in the MLS Cup, a single match hosted by the team with the better regular season record.

Qualification 
Qualification for the 2014 MLS Cup Playoffs was based on the results of the 2014 Regular Season. The five teams from each conference with the highest point totals were seeded into their conference playoff bracket.

The 2014 regular season ran from March 8, 2014 to October 26, 2014. Teams played 34 games total, 17 at home and 17 away and were awarded three points for a win, one point for a tie (draw), and zero points for a loss. When two or more teams have the same point totals, the following tiebreak rules were applied:
 Total number of wins
 Goal Differential
 Goals For
 Fewest Disciplinary Points in the official points table
 Road Goals Differential
 Road Goal For
 Home Goals Differential
 Home Goal For
 Coin Toss (2 clubs) or Drawing of Lots (3 or more)

Eastern Conference Table

Western Conference Table

Bracket

Schedule

Knockout round

Eastern Conference

Western Conference

Conference Semifinals

Eastern Conference 

New England Revolution won 7–3 on aggregate

New York Red Bulls advanced 3–2 on aggregate

Western Conference 

Los Angeles Galaxy advanced 5–0 on aggregate

Seattle Sounders advanced on an away goal

Conference Finals 

New England Revolution advanced 4–3 on aggregate

Los Angeles Galaxy advanced on an away goal

MLS Cup

Goalscorers

See also 
 2014 in American soccer
 2014 Major League Soccer season
 2014 U.S. Open Cup

References 

2014